Gardan-e Tol Bardangan (also Romanized as Gardan-e Tol Bardangān; also known as Gardaneh-ye Tol Bardangān, Gardaneh-ye Tol-e Bardangān, and Gardan Tol) is a village in Bakesh-e Do Rural District, in the Central District of Mamasani County, Fars Province, Iran. At the 2006 census, its population was 370, in 76 families.

References 

Populated places in Mamasani County